Chaldene , also known as , is a retrograde irregular satellite of Jupiter. It was discovered by a team of astronomers from the University of Hawaii led by Scott S. Sheppard, in 2000, and given the temporary designation .

Chaldene is about 3.8 kilometres in diameter, and orbits Jupiter at an average distance of 22,713,000 km in 759.88 days, at an inclination of 167° to the ecliptic (169° to Jupiter's equator), in a retrograde direction and with an eccentricity of 0.2916.

It was named in October 2002 after Chaldene, the mother of Solymos by Zeus in Greek mythology.

It belongs to the Carme group, made up of irregular retrograde moons orbiting Jupiter at a distance ranging between 23 and 24 Gm and at an inclination of about 165°.

References

Carme group
Moons of Jupiter
Irregular satellites
Discoveries by Scott S. Sheppard
Discoveries by David C. Jewitt
Discoveries by Yanga R. Fernandez
Discoveries by Eugene A. Magnier
20001126
Moons with a retrograde orbit